Mici may refer to:

People
 Gledi Mici (born 1991), football player
 Mici Erdélyi (1910–1994), Hungarian actress
 Mici Haraszti (1882-1964)
 Micí Mac Gabhann (1865–1948)

Places
Many Romanian toponyms have include the word Mici. .

Other
 Mici or Mititei, Romanian food